Walter Rollins is the name of:

 Walter C. Rollins (1857–1908), American racehorse trainer
 Walter E. Rollins (1906–1973), American songwriter/musician
 Walter Theodore Rollins, better known as Sonny Rollins, (born 1930), American jazz musician